Sri Siduhath Daham Pasala() is a daham school located in Ahangama Sri Siddhartharamaya Temple. It was initially founded as a Daham school in 2011.

External links 
 
 
  Official web site of SSDP destop version
  Official Wap site of Sri Siduhath Daham School
  International Wap site of Sri Siduhath Daham School

Schools in Galle District